The Ethernet Routing Switch 5500 Series or (ERS 5500) is a series of stackable, Layer 3 switches used in computer networking.  The ERS 5000 was originally designed by Nortel and is now manufactured by Avaya.  Up to 8 ERS 5000 Series Switches may be stacked in a 640 Gbit/s fast stacking configuration.  This Switch was used as the access layer device for the 2010 Winter Olympics games.  The 817 Access Switches supported 8782 Voice-over-IP telephones.

The Switches have an integrated time-domain reflectometer (TDR) built into every copper port, providing diagnostic monitoring and troubleshooting capabilities of the connected cables allowing for the troubleshooting of cable defects (crimped, cut, shorted or damaged cables) from the telnet, SNMP, web and console management interfaces.  This test provides a very reliable test to identify if the cable is good or faulty. The Switches also include an integrated packet sniffer built into every port that can export the information on to a web page report (see the jpg to the right, an example of top 25 talkers on a switch) or export the information to an IPFIX server.  The web base reports will report top 10, 25, or 50 talkers.  Reports can also be created and sorted on source address, destination address, TOS, protocol, port number, source or destination ports, packet count, byte count, or first or last packet times.  Multiple ports can be monitored simultaneously or individually. A license is not required to enable this function.  The Management of the system is accomplished through a serial console (which presents both a menu structure and a command line interface), a web interface or with the device manager tools, which uses SNMP to communicate with the device.

Scaling 
System scaling is accomplished by stacking up to a maximum of eight units. A full stack of 5530 systems provides 192 copper 10/100/1000BASE-T ports, 96 1000BASE-X Small form-factor pluggable transceiver ports, and 16 10 Gigabit Ethernet XFP ports. A full stack of 5510-48T, or 5520-48T systems provides up to 384 ports—352 fixed copper 10/100/1000BASE-T ports, and 32 switchable copper/SFP ports. Stacks can consist of any mix of 5500 series systems.

Software

Version 6.1 major features 
IPFIX is now part of the standard software package and no license is required.  Username and password security has been enhanced with expansion of the password history to ten.  T1 can now support SFP.  The 802.1X dynamic authorization extension now allows third-party devices to dynamically change VLANs or close user sessions.

Version 6.2 major features 
The enterprise device manager has replaced the Java-based device manager as well as web-based management.  The automatic QoS engine has been enhanced, including the ability to run it, ADAC, and 802.1AB MED simultaneously.  Dual syslog server support now allows syslog messages to be simultaneously recorded onto two servers at once, in case one becomes unavailable.  New energy-saving implementations can reduce energy use by 40% through decreasing energy usage during non-peak hours.  Multicast groups can now be scaled to three different levels.

See also

 Power over Ethernet

References

Further reading

External links

ERS 5500
ERS 5500
Hardware routers